The Sumatran ground cuckoo (Carpococcyx viridis) is a large, terrestrial species of cuckoo. It was introduced to Western science in 1879 and was formerly considered conspecific with the Bornean ground cuckoo but was given status as a unique species in 2000. This elusive species was initially known from just eight specimens and evaded notice from 1916 until 1997, when it was rediscovered and photographed by Andjar Rafiastanto. The Sumatran ground cuckoo's diet is thought to consist of invertebrates, small mammals, and reptiles.

Characteristics 
The Sumatran ground cuckoo is a large, terrestrial bird with a long, full tail. Adult birds reach an average length of 55 cm. Its bill and sturdy legs are both green and it has a black crown, shading to green on hind crown. Its mantle, upper back, neck sides, lower throat, upper breast, wing-coverts and secondaries are dull green and its lower back is brown with broad greenish-brown bars. The wings and tail are glossy and greenish-black. The rest of its underparts are cinnamon-buff, more rufous on flanks and it displays striking green, lilac and blue bare skin around the eyes. Its repertoire of vocalizations is little-known but one recently recorded call consisted of repeated low whistles, falling then rising in tone and issued in a rising series (we-ow-we, we-ow-we, we-ow-we, we-ow-we; each phrase slightly higher than last).

Distribution and habitat 
The Sumatran ground cuckoo is endemic to Indonesia and is found exclusively on the island of Sumatra. Notes on early specimen labels suggest its favoured habitat is foothills and primary montane rainforest, and this is reinforced by the locations of recent sightings. It has been found between elevations of 300 and 1400 metres. Because it is so rare today, a considerable body of information on the Sumatran ground cuckoo comes only from the records of Tommaso Salvadori, the Italian ornithologist and zoologist who discovered it; there does not seem to have been much effort to learn more about the bird from locals.

It is estimated by the IUCN Red List of Threatened Species that the total population of Sumatran ground cuckoos ranges from 50 to 249 mature individuals, and its population is thought to be decreasing. It is considered one of the 100 most endangered bird species in the world. Like its close relative the Bornean ground cuckoo it is considered unobtrusive, which may further account for the lack of sightings.

Most modern-day sightings have taken place in the Barisan Mountains in South Sumatra, beginning with the individual photographed in Bukit Barisan Selatan National Park in 1997. Five more sightings were reported in the immediate vicinity between 2007 and 2010. An additional unconfirmed sighting took place in the Bukit Rimbang-Baling Wildlife Sanctuary in 2000. In 2006, a camera-trap surveying for tigers close to Kerinci Seblat National Park, also in the Barisan Mountains, captured multiple images of the Sumatran ground cuckoo for the first time since 1997 and only the second time in the last ninety years.

In 2007, its call was recorded for the first time according to the New York-based Wildlife Conservation Society in a statement released February 26. The call was recorded by WCS biologists after a trapper handed them a bird he had caught.

In 2017, a camera trap in Batang Gadis National Park took a photo of a Sumatran ground cuckoo, indicating that a previously-unknown population may exist in North Sumatra.

Status and conservation
Due to ongoing habitat loss and small population size, the Sumatran ground cuckoo is evaluated as Critically Endangered on the IUCN Red List of Threatened Species.

Though there is limited knowledge on the Sumatran ground cuckoo itself, it is thought to face many of the same population pressures as the Sumatran elephant, orangutan, rhinoceros, and tiger. Deforestation is the main threat and was found to result in an average 2% loss of forest within Bukit Barisan Selatan National Park, one of the bird's primary refuges, between 1985 and 1999. The park's lower montane forest is usually removed to make way for palm oilplantations; since 2006 Indonesia has been the biggest producer of palm oil and has seen a 400% growth in production between 1994 and 2004. Production is expected to double by the end of 2030. As the Sumatran ground cuckoo prefers primary forest with dense undergrowth, reforestation is unlikely to be as effective as protective measures for currently-existing habitat. Even protected areas, however, are experiencing significant rates of deforestation. The type locality, Gunung Singgalang, has seen reduction of forest up to 1,800-1,900m as early as 1917.

Because it is a ground forager, the Sumatran ground cuckoo may also be susceptible to bycatch through hunting by use of snares: a bird was recently captured in a snare that was almost certainly set for Red Junglefowl.

Limited conservation actions are currently underway. The Barisan Mountains contain 20 protected areas, some of which lie within the Sumatran ground cuckoo's currently known range. The species likely benefits from many of the protected areas established for other Sumatran endemics, but its full spectrum of conservation needs is unlikely to be known until further surveys are conducted.

The IUCN has made a number of suggestions for future conservation actions. Now that the species' call has been recorded, it is possible to conduct extensive surveys to better establish its true range, distribution, and population, and to determine its habitat requirements, threats, and conservation needs. Once surveys have provided sufficient information, the IUCN advises a review of existing protected areas and, if key populations are not adequately represented within them, advocation for further establishment of strategic protected areas. Like many other Sumatran endemics, the species should be afforded full protection under Indonesian law.

The Sumatran ground cuckoo may benefit if ecotourism is introduced to the area, but this still entails commodifying habitat, and may help in the short-term but would not be a guarantee of future conservation.

References

External links 
 Tiger trap goes cuckoo article at BirdLife International
 
 

Sumatran ground cuckoo
Birds of Sumatra
Endemic fauna of Sumatra
Critically endangered fauna of Asia
Sumatran ground cuckoo
Taxa named by Tommaso Salvadori